The Center for Infectious Disease Research (CIDR) is housed at the Medical College of Wisconsin (MCW) in Milwaukee. The CIDR houses a BSL3 laboratory. As of 2021, its focus is "on understanding the molecular mechanisms of pathogenesis related to infection with all types of microorganisms, viruses, fungi or parasites."

History
The CIDR was established in 2002 as the Center for Bioterrorism and Infectious Diseases (CBID).

The name was changed to its current status in 2010.

Over a three year period in the early 2010s, a total of four notifiable accidents involving dermal punctures.

As of 2015, the MCW operated two BSL-3 laboratories both on the main campus in Wauwatosa.

In May 2015, it was reported that "MCW's lab is registered with the federal government to work with the Gram-negative bacteria known as Francisella."

References

BSL3 laboratories in the United States